A flashcard or flash card (also known as an index card) is a card bearing information on both sides, which is intended to be used as an aid in memorization. Each flashcard bears a question on one side and an answer on the other. Flashcards are often used to memorize vocabulary, historical dates, formulas or any subject matter that can be learned via a question-and-answer format. Flashcards can be virtual (part of a flashcard software), or physical.

Flashcards are an application of the testing effect − the finding that long-term memory is increased when some of the learning period is devoted to retrieving the information through testing with proper feedback. Study habits affect the rate at which a flashcard-user learns, and proper spacing of flashcards has been proven to accelerate learning. A number of spaced repetition software programs exist which take advantage of this principle.

Use 
Flashcards exercise the mental process of active recall: given a prompt (the question), one produces the answer. Beyond the content of cards, which are collected in decks, there is the question of use – how does one use the cards, in particular, how frequently does one review (more finely, how does one schedule review) and how does one react to errors, either complete failures to recall or mistakes? Various systems have been developed, mostly based around spaced repetition – increasing the time intervals between reviews whenever a card is recalled correctly.

Spaced repetition 

Spaced repetition is an evidence-based learning technique which incorporates increasing time intervals between each review of a flashcard in order to exploit the psychological spacing effect. Newly introduced and more difficult flashcards are shown more frequently while older and less difficult flashcards are shown less frequently. The use of spaced repetition has been shown to increase rate of learning. Although the principle is useful in many contexts, spaced repetition is commonly applied in contexts in which a learner must acquire a large number of items and retain them indefinitely in memory. It is, therefore, well suited for the problem of vocabulary acquisition in the course of second language learning. Spaced repetition software has been developed to aid the learning process.

Leitner system 

The Leitner system is a widely used method of efficiently using flashcards that was proposed by the German science journalist Sebastian Leitner in the 1970s. It is a simple implementation of the principle of spaced repetition, where cards are reviewed at increasing intervals.

In this method flashcards are sorted into groups according to how well the learner knows each one in the Leitner's learning box. The learners try to recall the solution written on a flashcard. If they succeed, they send the card to the next group. If they fail, they send it back to the first group. Each succeeding group has a longer period of time before the learner is required to revisit the cards. In Leitner's original method, published in his book So lernt man Lernen (How to learn to learn), the schedule of repetition was governed by the size of the partitions in the learning box. These were 1, 2, 5, 8 and 14 cm. Only when a partition became full was the learner to review some of the cards it contained, moving them forward or back depending on whether they remembered them.

Software

There is a wide range of software (including open source and online services) available for creating and using virtual flashcards as an aid to learning. To date, there are the following types of electronic flashcards: one-sided cards; Two-sided cards; Three-sided cards.

Two-sided cards
Physical flashcards are two-sided; in some contexts one wishes to correctly produce the opposite side upon being presented with either side, such as in foreign language vocabulary; in other contexts one is content to go in only one direction, such as in producing a poem given its title or incipit (opening). For physical flashcards, one may either use a single card, flipping it according to the direction, or two parallel decks, such as one English-Japanese and one Japanese-English. They have a number of uses and can be simple or elaborate depending on the user. It is demonstrated that a two-sided flashcard is one of the most effective ways to learn foreign language vocabulary that helps learners memorize more easily, remember forever and learn more flexibly.

Three-sided cards
Physical flashcards are necessarily two-sided. A variant, found in electronic flashcards, is what is known as a three-sided card. This is a particular kind of asymmetric two-sided card; abstractly, such a card has three fields, Q, A, A*, where Q & A are reversed on flipping, but A* is always in the answer – the two "sides" are thus Q/A,A* and A/Q,A*. Concretely, these are most used for learning foreign vocabulary where the foreign pronunciation is not transparent from the foreign writing – in this case the Question is the native word, the Answer is the foreign word (written), and the pronunciation is always part of the answer (Answer*). This is particularly the case for Chinese characters, as in Chinese hanzi and Japanese kanji, but can also be used for other non-phonetic spellings, including English as a second language.

The purpose of three-sided cards is to provide the benefits of two-sided cards – ease of authoring (enter data once to create two cards), synchronized updates (changes to one are reflected in the other), and spacing between opposite sides (so opposite sides of the same card are not tested too close together) – without the card needing to be symmetric.

One can generalize this principle to an arbitrary number of data fields associated with a single record, with each field representing a different aspect of a fact or bundle of facts.

Using Flashcards for math 
Flashcards are often used for math to help students learn in a way that entertains them and still lets them learn. While they are limited in nature they are still a good way to encourage students to learn math. They can be used with addition, subtraction, multiplication, division, fractions, decimals, area, percentages and more. Students read the problem on one side of the flashcard then look at the other side to see the answer. They are a great way memorize math facts as they are repetitive.

Examples
An English-speaking student learning the Chinese word 人 (rén, person or people):
Q: person
A: 人, rén
Reverse:
Q: 人
A: rén, person
Or a French student learning the English word  "enough" (assez in French). Due to the irregular pronunciation of the -ough, the IPA pronunciation is given along with the word itself.
Q: assez
A: enough 
Reverse:
Q: enough
A: , assez

History
Paper flashcards have been used since at least the 19th century, with Reading Disentangled (1834), a set of phonics flashcards by English educator Favell Lee Mortimer being credited by some as the first flashcards. Previously, a single-sided hornbook had been used for early literacy education.

The Leitner system for scheduling flashcards was introduced by German scientific journalist Sebastian Leitner in the 1970s, specifically his 1972 So lernt man lernen. Der Weg zum Erfolg (How to learn to learn), while the SuperMemo program and algorithm (specifically the SM-2 algorithm, which is the most popular in other programs) was introduced on December 13, 1987, by Polish researcher Piotr Woźniak.

References

Learning methods